Laurence Young may refer to:
Laurence Chisholm Young, (1905-2000), American mathematician
Laurence R. Young, American physicist
Lawrence S. Young, British molecular oncologist